Booster Lake is located in Nopiming Provincial Park in the province of Manitoba, Canada.

Highway 315 runs north of the lake.

The lake is fed by several creeks, and is drained by Booster Creek into Bird Lake, the source of Bird River, a tributary of the Winnipeg River.

The original road into the area was used for logging and mining. Years ago, they mined for gold, although that mine has been closed and dismantled. Active mining in the area is done around Bernic Lake by The Tanco Mining Company. The mine is an active producer of caesium, tantalum & spodumene.

External links
Booster Lake Website

Lakes of Manitoba